Tarnation may refer to:

 Minced oath, form of Damnation, everlasting punishment
 Tarnation (band), a San Francisco-based alt-country-goth band
 Tarnation (2003 film), a 2003 documentary film by Jonathan Caouette
 Tarnation (2017 film), a 2017 Australian horror film by Daniel Armstrong